Stephanie M. Camp (March 27, 1968 – April 2, 2014) was an American feminist historian. Her book, Closer to Freedom: Enslaved Women and Everyday Resistance in the Plantation South (2004), led to a new understanding of how female slaves resisted their captivity in the 1800s. The book won the Lillian Smith Book Award for New Voices in Non-Fiction and an Honorable Mention by the John Hope Franklin Prize; it was short-listed for the Washington State Book Award.

She co-edited an anthology, New Studies in the History of American Slavery (2006), which was inspired by a symposium she organized at the University of Washington in 2002, called "New Studies in American Slavery", as well as a follow-up symposium organized by Herman Bennett at Rutgers University.

Camp grew up in Philadelphia, Pennsylvania, where she attended H.C. Lea Elementary School and graduated from Philadelphia High School for Girls. She earned her bachelor's and doctoral degrees from the University of Pennsylvania and her master's degree from Yale University. She worked from 2008 to 2010 as an associate professor at Rice University, and most recently before her death she worked as a professor at the  University of Washington.

In 2007, Camp and a graduate student at the University of Washington organized a protest about Woodland Park Zoo's Maasai Journey program, which featured Maasai cultural elements in a zoo setting; Camp argued that it referenced a time when African people were grouped together with animals at world fairs.

Death
She died of cancer in Seattle on April 2, 2014, aged 46. Shortly before her death she had begun to work on a book about race and beauty.

She was survived by her son, Luc Ade Mariani, and his father Marc Mariani of Seattle; and her parents, Donald Eugene Camp and Marie Josephe (Dumont) Camp, and a sister, Dorothea Rae Camp.

References

1968 births
2014 deaths
Writers from Philadelphia
American feminists
Historians from Pennsylvania
Deaths from cancer in Washington (state)